George's Mother is a novel by American novelist Stephen Crane, first published in 1896.  The novel relates to Crane's earlier novel Maggie: A Girl of the Streets, as the title character of that work makes a brief appearance.

Novels by Stephen Crane
1896 American novels